This is a list of high schools in the U.S. state of Idaho.

Alphabetical list

Aberdeen High School, Aberdeen
American Falls High School, American Falls
Bear Lake High School, Montpelier
Bishop Kelly High School, Boise
Black Canyon High School, Emmett
Blackfoot High School, Blackfoot
Bliss High School, Bliss
Boise High School, Boise
Bonners Ferry High School, Bonners Ferry
Bonneville High School, Idaho Falls
Borah High School, Boise
Buhl High School, Buhl
Burley High School, Burley
Butte County High School, Arco
Caldwell High School, Caldwell
Camas County High School, Fairfield
Cambridge High School, Cambridge
Canyon Springs High School, Caldwell
Canyon Ridge High School, Twin Falls
Capital High School, Boise
Carey High School, Carey
Cascade High School, Cascade
Castleford High School, Castleford
Centennial High School, Boise
Century High School, Pocatello
Challis High School, Challis
Clark County High School, Dubois
Clark Fork Junior/Senior High School, Clark Fork
Clearwater Valley High School, Kooskia
Coeur d'Alene Charter Academy, Coeur d'Alene
Coeur d'Alene High School, Coeur d'Alene
Cole Valley Christian High School, Meridian
Columbia High School, Nampa
Community School, Sun Valley
Compass Academy, Idaho Falls
Compass Public Charter School, Meridian
Council High School, Council
Culdesac High School, Culdesac
Deary High School, Deary
Declo High School, Declo
Dietrich High School, Dietrich
Eagle Academy, Eagle
Eagle High School, Eagle
Emmett High School, Emmett
Filer High School, Filer
Firth High School, Firth
Fruitland High School, Fruitland
Garden Valley High School, Garden Valley
Gem State Adventist Academy, Caldwell
Genesee High School, Genesee
Glenns Ferry High School, Glenns Ferry
Gooding High School, Gooding
Grace High School, Grace
Grangeville High School, Grangeville
Greenleaf Friends Academy, Greenleaf
Hagerman High School, Hagerman
Hansen High School, Hansen
Highland High School, Craigmont
Highland High School, Pocatello
Hillcrest High School, Ammon
Homedale High School, Homedale
Horseshoe Bend High School, Horseshoe Bend
Idaho Arts Charter School, Nampa
Idaho City High School, Idaho City
Idaho Connects Online School, Statewide
Idaho Falls High School, Idaho Falls
Idaho Leadership Academy, Blackfoot
Idaho School for the Deaf and Blind, Gooding
Idaho Stem Academy, Blackfoot
Initial Point High School, Kuna
iSucceed Virtual High School, Statewide
Jerome High School, Jerome
Kamiah High School, Kamiah
Kellogg High School, Kellogg
Kendrick High School, Kendrick
Kimberly High School, Kimberly
Kootenai Junior/Senior High School, Harrison
Kuna High School, Kuna
Lake City High School, Coeur d'Alene
Lakeland High School, Rathdrum
Lakeside High School, Plummer
Lapwai High School, Lapwai
Leadore High School, Leadore
Lewiston High School, Lewiston
Liberty Charter School, Nampa
Lighthouse Christian School, Twin Falls
Logos School, Moscow
Mackay High School, Mackay
Madison High School, Rexburg
Magic Valley Christian School, Jerome
Magic Valley Christian School, Twin Falls
Magic Valley High School, Twin Falls
Malad High School, Malad City
Marsh Valley High School, Arimo
Marsing High School, Marsing
McCall-Donnelly High School, McCall
Meadows Valley Junior/Senior High School, New Meadows
Melba High School, Melba
Meridian Academy, Meridian
Meridian High School, Meridian
Meridian Medical Arts Charter High School, Meridian
Meridian Technical Charter High School, Meridian
Middleton High School, Middleton
Midvale High School, Midvale
Minico High School, Rupert
Moscow High School, Moscow
Mountain Cove High School, Boise
Mountain Home High School, Mountain Home
Mountain View High School, Meridian
Mullan High School, Mullan
Murtaugh High School, Murtaugh
Nampa Christian School, Nampa
Nampa High School, Nampa
New Plymouth High School, New Plymouth
Nezperce High School, Nezperce
North Fremont High School, Ashton
North Gem High School, Bancroft
North Idaho Christian School, Hayden
North Star Charter School, Eagle
Notus High School, Notus
Oakley High School, Oakley
Orofino High School, Orofino
Owyhee High School, Meridian
Parma High School, Parma
Payette High School, Payette
Pocatello High School, Pocatello
Post Falls Christian Academy, Post Falls
Post Falls High School, Post Falls
Potlatch High School, Potlatch
Prairie High School, Cottonwood
Preston High School, Preston
Priest River Lamanna High School, Priest River
Raft River High School, Malta
Renaissance High School, Meridian
Richfield High School, Richfield
Rigby High School, Rigby
Rimrock High School, Bruneau
Ririe High School, Ririe
Riverstone International School, Boise
Rockland High School, Rockland
Rocky Mountain High School, Meridian
Sage International School of Boise, Boise
Salmon High School, Salmon
Salmon River High School, Riggins
Sandpoint High School, Sandpoint
Shelley High School, Shelley
Shoshone-Bannock Jr./Sr. High School, Fort Hall
Shoshone High School, Shoshone
Skyline High School, Idaho Falls
Skyview High School, Nampa
Snake River High School, Blackfoot
Soda Springs High School, Soda Springs
South Fremont High School, St. Anthony
St. Maries High School, St. Maries
Sugar-Salem High School, Sugar City
Taylor's Crossing Public Charter School, Idaho Falls
Teton High School, Driggs
The Ambrose School, Meridian
Thunder Ridge High School, Idaho Falls
Timberlake High School, Spirit Lake
Timberline High School, Boise
Timberline High School, Weippe
Troy High School, Troy
Twin Falls Christian Academy, Twin Falls
Twin Falls High School, Twin Falls
Valley High School, Hazelton
Vallivue High School, Caldwell
Victory Charter School, Nampa
Wallace High School, Wallace
Weiser High School, Weiser
Wendell High School, Wendell
West Jefferson High School, Terreton
West Side High School, Dayton
Wilder High School, Wilder
Wood River High School, Hailey
Xavier Charter School, Twin Falls

Schools by county

Ada County
Bishop Kelly High School, Boise
Boise High School, Boise
Borah High School, Boise
Capital High School, Boise 5A
Centennial High School, Boise
Cole Valley Christian High School, Meridian
Compass Public Charter School, Meridian
Eagle Academy, Eagle
Eagle High School, Eagle
Initial Point High School, Kuna
Kuna High School, Kuna
Meridian Academy, Meridian
Meridian High School, Meridian 5A
Meridian Medical Arts Charter High School, Meridian
Meridian Technical Charter High School, Meridian
Mountain Cove High School, Boise
Mountain View High School, Meridian 5A
North Star Charter School, Eagle
Owyhee High School, Meridian
Renaissance High School, Meridian
Riverstone International School, Boise
Rocky Mountain High School, Meridian
Sage International School, Boise
The Ambrose School, Meridian
Timberline High School, Boise

Adams County
Council High School, Council
Meadows Valley Junior/Senior High School, New Meadows

Bannock County
Pocatello High School, Pocatello
Highland High School, Pocatello
Century High School, Pocatello
Marsh Valley High School, Arimo

Bear Lake County
Bear Lake High School, Montpelier

Benewah County
Lakeside High School, Plummer
St. Maries High School, St. Maries

Bingham County
Aberdeen High School, Aberdeen
Blackfoot High School, Blackfoot
Firth High School, Firth
Idaho Leadership Academy, Blackfoot
Shelley High School, Shelley
Sho-Ban School, Fort Hall
Snake River High School, Blackfoot

Blaine County
Carey High School, Carey
Community School, Sun Valley
Wood River High School, Hailey

Boise County
Garden Valley High School, Garden Valley
Horseshoe Bend High School, Horseshoe Bend
Idaho City High School, Idaho City

Bonner County
Clark Fork Junior/Senior High School, Clark Fork
Priest River Lamanna High School, Priest River
Sandpoint High School, Sandpoint

Bonneville County
Bonneville High School, Idaho Falls 5A
Compass Academy, Idaho Falls
Hillcrest High School, Ammon
Idaho Falls High School, Idaho Falls 5A
Skyline High School, Idaho Falls5A
Taylor's Crossing Public Charter School, Idaho Falls
Thunder Ridge High School, Idaho Falls 5A

Boundary County
Bonners Ferry High School, Bonners Ferry

Butte County
Butte County High School, Arco

Camas County
Camas County High School, Fairfield

Canyon County
Caldwell High School, Caldwell
Canyon Springs High School, Caldwell
Columbia High School, Nampa
Gem State Adventist Academy, Caldwell
Greenleaf Friends Academy, Greenleaf
Idaho Arts Charter School, Nampa
Liberty Charter School, Nampa
Melba High School, Melba
Middleton High School, Middleton
Nampa High School, Nampa
Nampa Christian School, Nampa
Notus High School, Notus
Parma High School, Parma
Skyview High School, Nampa
Vallivue High School, Caldwell
Victory Charter School, Nampa
Wilder High School, Wilder

Caribou County
Grace High School, Grace
North Gem High School, Bancroft
Soda Springs High School, Soda Springs

Cassia County
Burley High School, Burley
Declo High School, Declo
Oakley High School, Oakley
Raft River High School, Malta

Clark County
Clark County High School, Dubois

Clearwater County
Orofino High School, Orofino
Timberline High School, Weippe

Custer County
Challis High School, Challis
Mackay High School, Mackay

Elmore County
Glenns Ferry High School, Glenns Ferry
Mountain Home High School, Mountain Home

Franklin County
Preston High School, Preston
West Side High School, Dayton

Fremont County
North Fremont High School, Ashton
South Fremont High School, St. Anthony

Gem County
Black Canyon High School, Emmett
Emmett High School, Emmett

Gooding County
Bliss High School, Bliss
Gooding High School, Gooding
Hagerman High School, Hagerman
Idaho School for the Deaf and Blind, Gooding
Wendell High School, Wendell

Idaho County
Clearwater Valley High School, Kooskia
Grangeville High School, Grangeville
Prairie High School, Cottonwood
Salmon River High School, Riggins

Jefferson County
Rigby High School, Rigby 5A
Ririe High School, Ririe
West Jefferson High School, Terreton

Jerome County
Jerome High School, Jerome
Valley High School, Hazelton

Kootenai County
Coeur d'Alene High School, Coeur d'Alene 5A
Coeur d'Alene Charter Academy, Coeur d'Alene
Kootenai High School, Harrison
Lake City High School, Coeur d'Alene 5A
Lakeland High School, Rathdrum
North Idaho Christian School, Hayden
Post Falls Christian Academy, Post Falls
Post Falls High School, Post Falls 5A
Timberlake High School, Spirit Lake

Latah County
Deary High School, Deary
Genesee High School, Genesee
Kendrick High School, Kendrick
Logos School, Moscow
Moscow High School, Moscow
Potlatch High School, Potlatch
Troy High School, Troy

Lemhi County 
Leadore High School, Leadore
Salmon High School, Salmon

Lewis County
Highland High School, Craigmont
Kamiah High School, Kamiah
Nezperce High School, Nezperce

Lincoln County
Dietrich High School, Dietrich
Richfield High School, Richfield
Shoshone High School, Shoshone

Madison County
Madison High School, Rexburg 5A
Sugar-Salem High School, Sugar City

Minidoka County
Minico High School, Rupert

Nez Perce County
Culdesac High School, Culdesac
Lapwai High School, Lapwai
Lewiston High School, Lewiston 5A

Oneida County
Malad High School, Malad City

Owyhee County
Homedale High School, Homedale
Marsing High School, Marsing
Rimrock High School, Bruneau

Payette County
Fruitland High School, Fruitland
New Plymouth High School, New Plymouth
Payette High School, Payette

Power County
American Falls High School, American Falls
Rockland High School, Rockland

Shoshone County
Kellogg High School, Kellogg
Mullan High School, Mullan
Wallace High School, Wallace

Teton County
Teton High School, Driggs

Twin Falls County
Buhl High School, Buhl
Canyon Ridge High School, Twin Falls
Castleford High School, Castleford
Filer High School, Filer
Hansen High School, Hansen
Kimberly High School, Kimberly
Lighthouse Christian School, Twin Falls
Magic Valley Christian School, Twin Falls (closed)
Magic Valley High School, Twin Falls
Murtaugh High School, Murtaugh
Twin Falls Christian Academy, Twin Falls
Twin Falls High School, Twin Falls
Xavier Charter School, Twin Falls

Valley County
Cascade High School, Cascade
McCall-Donnelly High School, McCall

Washington County
Cambridge High School, Cambridge
Midvale High School, Midvale
Weiser High School, Weiser

See also
List of school districts in Idaho

Idaho
Schools